The International Federation of Free Teachers' Unions (IFFTU) was a global union federation of trade unions representing teachers.

History
The International Federation of Teachers' Trade Unions was founded after World War II, and affiliated to the World Federation of Trade Unions (WFTU).  When the large majority of Western trade unions left the WFTU, the teachers' trade secretariat was the only one to remain affiliated to the WFTU.  To fill this gap, the new International Confederation of Free Trade Unions (ICFTU) held a meeting in Paris in 1951 to found a rival international secretariat, the "International Federation of Free Teachers' Unions".

By 1960, the secretariat had 12 affiliates in 11 countries, with a total of 229,500 members, and continued to grow rapidly.  At the end of 1992, it merged with the World Confederation of Organisations of the Teaching Profession, to form Education International.

Affiliates
In 1960, the following unions were affiliated to the federation:

Leadership

General Secretaries
1951: Maurice van de Moortel
1965: Andre Braconier
1981: Fred van Leeuwen

Presidents
1951: Irvin Kuenzli
1956: Pierre Reymond-Sauvin
1965: Heinrich Roden
1972: Erich Frister
1981: Albert Shanker

References

Global union federations
Education trade unions
Trade unions established in 1951
Trade unions disestablished in 1992